This is a list of notable Greeks.

Actors/actresses

Ancient period
 Metrobius
 Thespis

Adventurers
 Constantine Phaulkon (1648–1688), first counsellor of King Narai of Siam

Athletes & sports figures
 Giannis Antetokounmpo
 George Karlaftis
 Nick Galis
 Miltos Tentoglou

Ancient period
 Alexander I of Macedon, runner and Olympic winner
 Astylos of Croton
 Pheidippides 
 Chionis of Sparta
 Cynisca
 Diagoras of Rhodes
 Dioxippus, pankration
 Hydna, swimmer and diver
 Kleitomachos, pankration
 Leonidas of Rhodes, ancient runner and Olympic winner
 Milo of Croton, pankration 
 Troilus of Elis
 Phillip of Macedon

Modern period
 Aristotle George (Harry) Agganis baseball and American football player
 Aristidis Akratopoulos tennis player
 Konstantinos Akratopoulos tennis player
 Giannis Antetokounmpo basketball player
 Nikos Alefantos football player and manager
 Anna Korakaki sport shooter and Olympic champion
 Andreas Bouchalakis football player
 Lampros Choutos football player
 Fanis Christodoulou basketball player
 Anton Christoforidis boxer
 Stephanos Christopoulos wrestler
 Constantine II former King of Greece, 1960 Olympic champion in sailing (Dragon class)
 Ioannis Chrysafis gymnast
 Nikos Dabizas football player
 Evangelos Damaskos pole vaulter
 Nick "the Greek" Dandolos, gambler
 Eleni Daniilidou tennis player
 Filipos Darlas football player
 Stefanos Dedas (born 1982), basketball head coach in the Israel Basketball Premier League
 Dimitrios Deligiannis marathoner
 Traianos Dellas football player
 Hrysopiyí Devetzí triple jumper and long jumper
 Themistoklis Diakidis high jumper
 Dimitris Diamantidis basketball player
 Georgios Diamantis shooter
 Dimosthenis Dikoudis basketball player
 Pyrros Dimas three-time Olympic champion weightlifter 
 Stefanos Dimitrios middle-distance runner
 Zoi Dimoschaki swimmer
 Mimis Domazos football player
 Giorgos Donis football player
 Dimitrios Drivas swimmer
 Kostas Eleftherakis football player
 Dimitrios Eleftheropoulos football player
 Giannoulis Fakinos football player
 Panagiotis Fasoulas basketball player
 Giannis Fetfatzidis football player
 Alexios Fetsios shooter
 Angelos Fetsis middle-distance runner
 Giorgos Foiros football player and manager
 Antonis Fotsis basketball player
 D. Frangopoulos tennis player
 Takis Fyssas football player
 Nikos Galis basketball player, MVP of Eurobasket 1987
 Konstadinos Gatsioudis javelin thrower
 Theofanis Gekas football player
 Georgios Gennimatas sprinter
 Nikolaos Georgantas discus thrower
 Grigorios Georgatos football player
 Giorgios Georgiadis football player
 Ioannis Georgiadis fencer
 Evangelos Gerakeris marathoner
 Panagiotis Giannakis basketball player, captain of Greek Eurobasket 1987 champion team 
 Stelios Giannakopoulos football player
 Kleopas Giannou football player
 Herodotos Giorgallas gymnast
 Giannis Gitsioudis football player
 Andreas Glyniadakis basketball player
 Spyros Gogolos football player
 Dimitrios Golemis middle-distance runner
 Georgios Gougoulias football player
 Yannis Goumas football player
 Anastasios Gousis sprinter
 Miltiadis Gouskos shot putter
 Georgios Grigoriou marathoner
 Efstratios Grivas chess player
 Faní Halkiá Olympic champion hurdler
 Vassilis Hatzipanagis football player
 José Holebas football player
 Periklis Iakovakis hurdler
 Georgios Iatridis fencer
 Miltiades Iatrou cyclist
 Takis Ikonomopoulos football player
 Giannis Ioannidis basketball player and coach
 Leonidas Kabantais football player
 Pantelis Kafes football player
 Ilias Kafetzis marathoner
 Kakhi Kakhiashvili weightlifter
 Michalis Kakiouzis basketball player
 Nikos Kaklamanakis windsurfer
 Michalis Kalamiotis football player
 Ioannis Kalitzakis football player
 Georgios Kalogiannidis archer
 George Kalovelonis tennis player
 Marios Kaperonis boxer
 Michalis Kapsis football player
 Alexandros Karageorgiou archer
 Giorgos Karagounis football player
 Telemachos Karakalos fencer
 Karakatsanis shooter
 Konstantinos Karakatsanis middle-distance runner
 Pantelis Karasevdas shooter
 Hristos Karipidis football player
 Filippos Karvelas gymnast
 Michalis Kasapis football player
 Dionysios Kasdaglis tennis player
 Fanis Katergiannakis football player
 N. Kartavas swimmer
 Kostas Katsouranis football player
Ioannis Kastritis former basketball player and coach in the Israel Basketball Premier League
 Anastasía Kelesídou discus thrower
 Konstantinos Kenteris European, World and Olympic champion sprinter
 Alexandros Khalkokondilis sprinter and long jumper
 Hatzidakis shooter
 Dimitrios Christopoulos marathoner
 Vassilis Kikilias basketball player
 Michalis Klokidis football player
 Frank Klopas, football player
 Ekaterini Koffa sprinter
 Savvas Kofidis football player
 Dimitrios Kokotis high jumper
 Georgios Kolettis cyclist
 Georgios Koltsidas football player
 Giorgos Koltzos football player
 Konstantinos Komninos-Miliotis fencer
 Ntinos Konstantakis football player
 Aristidis Konstantinidis cyclist
 Vasilis Konstantinou football player
 Konstantinos Konstantinou cyclist
 Michalis Konstantinou football player
 Dimitrious Konstantopolous football player
 Georgios Korakakis football player
 Prodromos Korkizoglou decathlete
 Anastasia Kostaki basketball player
 Nikos Kostakis football player
 Yiorgos Kostikos football player
 Athanasios Kostoulas football player
 Vasilios Kotronias chess player
 Ilias Kotsios football player
 Stefanos Kotsolis football player
 Giorgos Koudas football player
 Dinos Kouis football player
 Konstantinos Koukodimos long jumper
 Efthimios Kouloucheris football player
 Yiannis Kouros multiple world record-holding ultramarathoner
 Vasilios Koutsianikoulis football player
 Vaggelis Koutsoures football player
 Petros Kravaritis football player
 Ioannis Kyrastas football player
 Sotirios Kyrgiakos football player
 Anastasios Kyriakos football player
 Panagiotis Lagos football player
 Vassilis Lakis football player
 Alexi Lalas, football player
 Leonidas Langakis shooter
 Ioannis Lavrentis marathoner
 Sotiris Leontiou football player
 Nikolaos Levidis shooter
 Kostas Linoxilakis football player
 Spiros Livathinos football player and manager
 Spiridon Louis marathoner, winner of first modern Olympic marathon
 Takis Loukanidis football player
 Greg Louganis Olympic Diver 
 Konstantinos Loumpoutis football player
 Dimitrios Loundras gymnast
 Nikolaos Lyberopoulos football player
 Nikos Machlas football player
 Ioannis Malokinis swimmer
 Miréla Manjani javelin thrower
 Stelios Manolas football player
 Vlasios Maras gymnast
 Nick Markakis baseball player
 Dimitris Markos football player
 Stamatios Masouris marathoner
 Dimitris Mavrogenidis football player
 Loukas Mavrokefalidis basketball player
 Thomas Mavros football player
 Hristos Meletoglou triple jumper
 Angelos Messaris football player
 Anastasios Metaxas shooter
 Athanasios Michalopoulos volleyball player
 Nikolaos Michopoulos football player
 Zenon Mikhailidis shooter
 Kostas Mitroglou football player
 Ioannis Mitropoulos gymnast
 Tasos Mitropoulos football player
 Georgios Mitsibonas football player
 Antonis Miyiakis football player
 Vaggelis Moras football player
 Nikolaos Morakis shooter
 Irini Mouchou, triathlete 
 Andreas Mouratis football player
 Moustakopoulos shooter
 Apostolos Nanos archer
 Evangelos Nastos football player
 Konstantinos Nebegleras football player
 Kostas Negrepontis football player
 Kostas Nestoridis football player
 Apostolos Nikolaidis football and volleyball player
 Demis Nikolaidis football player
 Alexandros Nikolopoulos weightlifter
 Stamatios Nikolopoulos cyclist
 Antonios Nikopolidis football player
 Sotiris Ninis football player
 Nikos Nioplias football player
 Georgios Orphanidis shooter
 Alexandros Pagalis football player
 Alketas Panagoulias football player and manager
 Loukas Panourgias football player
 Pantazidis shooter
 Anastasios Pantos football player
 Alexandros Papadimitriou hammer thrower
 Avraam Papadopoulos football player
 Dimitrios Papadopoulos football player
 Lazaros Papadopoulos basketball player
 Antonios Papaioannou gymnast
 Mimis Papaioannou football player
 Lambros Papakostas high jumper
 Theodoros Papaloukas basketball player
 Manolis Papamakarios basketball player
 Christos Papanikolaou pole vaulter
 Georgios Papasideris weightlifter
 Eleftherios Papasymeon marathoner
 Athina Papayianni race walker
 Charilaos Pappas football player
 Tom Pappas, world champion decathlete
 Georgios Paraskevopoulos cyclist
 Panagiotis Paraskevopoulos discus thrower
 Mikhail Paskalides sprinter
 Konstantinos Paspatis tennis player
 Petros Passalis football player
 George Patis badminton player
 Voula Patoulidou hurdler
 Christos Patsatzoglou football player
 Patsouris shooter
 Pavlos Pavlidis shooter
 Antonios Pepanos swimmer
 Ioannis Persakis triple jumper
 Petros Persakis gymnast
 Aristovoulos Petmezas gymnast and shooter
 Demetrios Petrokokkinos tennis player
 Ioannis Phrangoudis shooter
 Mimis Pierrakos football player
 Periklis Pierrakos-Mavromichalis fencer
 Stiliani Pilatou long jumper
 Platis shooter
 Hristos Polihroniou hammer thrower
 Ioannis Poulos fencer
 Evangelia Psarra archer

 Leonidas Pyrgos fencer 
 Evangelos Rallis tennis player
 Kurt Rambis (Kyriakos Rambidis) basketball player, won 4 NBA championships with the Los Angeles Lakers
 Flora Redoumi hurdler
 Dimitrios Regas sprinter
 Efthimios Rentzias basketball player
 Elpida Romantzi archer
 Nicolas Rossolimo chess player
 Georgios Roubanis pole vaulter
 Sakis Rouvas pole vaulter (later became famous as a musician-entertainer)
 Maria Sakkari tennis player
 Dimitris Salpingidis football player
 Georgios Samaras football player
 Sanidis shooter
 Miltiadis Sapanis football player
 Dimitris Saravakos football player
 Nikos Sarganis football player
 Georgios Saridakis race walker
 Sofoklis Schortsanitis basketball player
 Yourkas Seitaridis football player
Ioannis Sfairopoulos (born 1967) basketball coach in the Israeli Basketball Premier League and EuroLeague
 Giorgos Sideris football player
 Nikolaos Siranidis diver
 Athanasios Skaltsogiannis
 Giannis Skopelitis football player
 Georgios Skoutarides sprinter and hurdler
 George Sotiropoulos mixed martial artist
 Vasileios Spanoulis basketball player
 Konstantinos Spetsiotis race walker
 Spiridon Stais shooter
 Andreas Stamatiadis football player
 Ieroklis Stoltidis football player
 Aryiro Strataki heptathlete
 Dimosthenis Tampakos gymnast
 Giannis Taralidis football player
 Alexandros Tatsis football player
 Efstathios Tavlaridis football player
 Irini Terzoglou shot putter
 Ekateríni Thánou sprinter
 Stefanos Theodoridis football player
 Georgios Theodoridis sprinter
 Ioannis Theodoropoulos pole vaulter
 Alexandros Theofilakis shooter
 Ioannis Theofilakis shooter
 Dimitrios Tomprof middle-distance runner
 Vasilis Torosidis football player
 Nicolaos Trikupis shooter
 A. Tryfiatis-Tripiaris cyclist
 Jake Tsakalidis basketball player
 Kostas Tsartsaris basketball player
 Loúis Tsátoumas long jumper
 Dimitrios Tsiamis triple jumper
 Paraskeví Tsiamíta triple jumper
 Nikos Tsiantakis football player
 Vassilis Tsiartas football player
 Konstantinos Tsiklitiras Olympic champion standing long jumper 
 Leonidas Tsiklitiras gymnast
 Aggeliki Tsiolakoudi javelin thrower
 Chris Tsiprailidis poker player
 Georgios Tsitas wrestler
 Stefanos Tsitsipas tennis player
 Athanasia Tsoumeleka race walker
 Tryfon Tzanetis football player
 Alexandros Tziolis football player
 Stavros Tziortziopoulos football player
 Alexandros Tzorvas football player
 Danai Varveri free diver
 Olga Vasdeki triple jumper
 Spyridon Vasdekis long jumper
 Charilaos Vasilakos marathoner
 Panagiotis Vasilopoulos basketball player
 Kostas Vassiliadis basketball player
 Fotini Vavatsi archer
 Vavis shooter
 Theodoros Velkos badminton player
 Stylianos Venetidis football player
 Tassos Venetis football player
 Anna Verouli javelin thrower
 Sotirios Versis weightlifter
 Kleanthis Vikelides football player
 Ekateríni Vóggoli discus thrower
 Ioannis Vourakis shooter
 Athanasios Vouros fencer
 Ian Vouyoukas basketball player
 Ioannis Vrettos marathoner
 Zisis Vryzas football player
 Loukas Vyntra football player
 Charalambos Xanthos poker player
 Níki Xánthou long jumper
 Thomas Xenakis gymnast
 Vasilios Xydas pole vaulter
 Theodoros Zagorakis football player, captain of Greek team which won 2004 European Championship 
 Akis Zikos football player
 Nikos Zisis basketball player
 Khristos Zoumis triple jumper

Clerics

Medieval period
 Saints Cyril and Methodius, monks and scholars, inventors of the Cyrillic script
 Saint Nicholas, 4th-century Christian saint and Greek Bishop of Myra (Demre in modern-day Turkey) in Lycia.
 Michael Cerularius (c. 1000–1059), Patriarch of Constantinople
 John Chrysostom (347–407), Christian bishop and orator
 Photios I of Constantinople (820–891), Patriarch of Constantinople and writer
 Pope Evaristus (c. 98–105), fourth Pope
 Pope Stephen I (254–257)
 Pope Agatho (678–681)
 Pope John VI (701–705)
 Pope John VII (706–709)
 Pope Alexander V (1409–1410), Roman Catholic Antipope in the Pisan line

Modern period
 Jacob Palaeologus (c. 1520–1585), Dominican friar, later antitrinitarian theologian; (Greek father)

See also:
 List of Constantinople patriarchs
 List of Greek Orthodox Patriarchs of Jerusalem
 List of Archbishops of Athens
 List of Archbishops of Cyprus

Entrepreneurs
 Giannis Alafouzos, ship-owner, TV station owner (Skai TV), owner of Panathinaikos F.C.
 Yiannis Carras, ship-owner, creator of Porto Carras Resort
 John D. Chandris and family, shipping industry, cruises
 Yiannis (Giannis) Dritsas, inventor of Frappe
 Sir Stelios Haji-Ioannou, entrepreneur, EasyJet founder 
 Arianna Huffington, media mogul, Huffington Post founder 
 Socrates Kokkalis, telecommunications magnate, former owner of Olympiacos F.C.
 John Latsis, shipping magnate
 Spiro Latsis, banking and shipping magnate
 Mike Lazaridis, founder and co-CEO of Research in Motion (RIM) 
 Evangelos Marinakis, shipowner, TV station owner (Mega Channel), owner of the football clubs Olympiacos F.C. and Nottingham Forest F.C. 
 Stavros Niarchos, shipping magnate
 Aristotle Onassis, shipping magnate
 Christina Onassis, shipping magnate
 Athina Onassis, granddaughter of Aristotle Onassis
 Ioannis Pangas, merchant and philanthropist
 Georgios Sinas, banker, diplomat and philanthropist
 Simon Sinas, banker, diplomat and philanthropist
 Basil Zaharoff, arms trader and financier
 Evangelis and Konstantinos Zappas, entrepreneurs and forefathers of modern Olympics
 Georgios Zarifis, banker
 Christakis Zografos, banker

Explorers

Ancient period
 Androsthenes of Thasos
 Archias of Pella
 Colaeus
 Demodamas
 Eudoxus of Cyzicus
 Euthymenes
 Hippalus
 Megasthenes
 Nearchus
 Patrocles the Geographer
 Pytheas
 Scylax
 Simmias

Medieval period
 Cosmas Indicopleustes

Early Modern
 Evstratii Delarov
 Jorge Griego
 Juan de Fuca
 Pedro de Candia

Modern
 Panayotis Potagos

Fashion designers
 Dimitris Parthenis (1944–2018)
 Nikos Apostolopoulos, fashion designer
 Sophia Kokosalaki (1972–2019), haute couture, women, designer for the 2004 Summer Olympics
 Jean Dessès (1904–1970)
 Mary Katrantzou

Fashion models
 Marios Lekkas
 Anna Rezan
 Julia Alexandratou
 Evagelia Aravani
 Elena Asimakopoulou
 Marietta Chrousala
 Isavella Dara (Miss Europe 1997)
 Mara Darmousli (winner of Elite Model Look contest 1998)
 Valentini Daskaloudi
 Aliki Diplarakou (Miss Europe 1930) 

 Katerina Georgiadou
 Jenny Hiloudaki (also DJ)
 Olympia Hopsonidou
 Valia Kakouti
 Katerina Kanonidou
 Irini Karra
 Alex Kavadias
 Vicky Kaya 
 Demetres Koutsavlakis
 Olga Kypriotou
 Christina Lekka (Miss International 1994)
 Katia Margaritoglou
 Maria Menounos
 Katerina Michalopoulou (Miss Europe 1991)
 Anna Nanousi
 Evelina Papantoniou
 Anastasia Perraki
 Chrissoula Rodi
 Panayiotis Simopoulos
 Irene Skliva (Miss World 1996)
 Maria Spiridaki
 Katerina Stikoudi
 Marina Tsintikidou (Miss Europe 1992)
 Doukissa Nomikou
 Zeta Makrypoulia
 Corinna Tsopei Miss Universe 1964

Filmmakers

 Theo Angelopoulos, writer and director (Ulysses' Gaze, Eternity and a Day)
 Michael Cacoyannis, writer, producer and director (Zorba the Greek, Electra, Iphigenia)
 George P. Cosmatos
 Costa-Gavras (Constantinos Gavras), writer, producer and director (Z, State of Siege, Missing)
 Peter Kambasis, writer, producer and director of internet-based films
 Milton Katselas, acting teacher and director (Butterflies Are Free, When You Comin' Back, Red Ryder?)
 Elia Kazan, director in theatre and film (Gentleman's Agreement, A Streetcar Named Desire, On the Waterfront, East of Eden, A Face in the Crowd)
 Ana Kokkinos
 Nikos Koundouros
 Thodoros Maragos
 Gregory Markopoulos
 George Miller, Australian filmmaker known for Happy Feet and Mad Max: Fury Road
 Nikos Nikolaidis, writer, producer, and director (Evrydiki BA 2O37, The Wretches Are Still Singing, Sweet Bunch, Morning Patrol, Singapore Sling, See You in Hell, My Darling, The Loser Takes It All, The Zero Years)
 Yorgos Lanthimos, Alps, Dogtooth, The Lobster
 John Cassavetes, Faces, A Woman Under the Influence

Military and political figures

Ancient period
 Agis III (r.338–?331 BCE), Spartan king who rebelled against Macedon in 331 BCE
 Alcibiades (450–404 BCE), Athenian general and statesman
 Alexander the Great (356–323 BCE) King of Macedon, and conqueror of the Persian Empire 
 Antiochus III the Great, (c. 241–187 BCE) Seleucid Monarch
 Antipater (c.390–319 BCE), Macedonian noble and Alexander the Great's regent in Macedon
 Aristides (530–468 BCE), Athenian statesman
 Cimon (510–450 BCE), Athenian leader and statesman
 Cleopatra VII Thea Philopator, (c.68–30 BCE) Queen of Egypt, from the Hellenistic Ptolemaic Dynasty 
 Demosthenes (384–322 BCE), politician and orator
 Dionysius I (c.432–367), ruler of the Syracusan empire
 Epaminondas (c.420–362), Theban general and statesman
 Eucratides, ruler of the Bactrian Greeks
 Leonidas (d.480 BCE), Spartan king, killed defending Greece from the Persians 
 Lycurgus (9th century BCE), semi-legendary Spartan lawgiver
 Lysander (d.395), Spartan general and hero during the Peloponnesian War
 Memnon of Rhodes (d.333), Greek mercenary general in Persian army under Darius III
 Miltiades, Athenian statesman and general
 Nearchus, Alexander's naval commander
 Peisistratus, Athenian tyrant
 Pericles (495–429 BCE), Athenian leader and statesman 
 Philip II of Macedon (382–336 BCE), Macedonian king and father of Alexander the Great
 Polycrates, Samian ruler
 Ptolemy I (c.356–285), Macedonian general under Alexander the Great, founded a dynasty in Egypt
 Pyrrhus of Epirus (c.318–272), invaded Italy, became known for victories of dubious value (Pyrrhic)
 Seleucus I, Macedonian general under Alexander the Great, founded dynasty in Persia
 Solon (638–558 BCE), Athenian lawmaker and archon
 Themistocles (c.514–449 BCE), Athenian statesman and admiral
 Xenophon (430–c.354 BCE), mercenary general, led and recounted march from Persia
 Saint George (AD c.275–303), soldier in the Roman army, venerated as a Christian martyr

Medieval period
 Alexius I Comnenus (1048–1118), Byzantine Emperor
 Basil II (963–1025), Emperor, known as the 'Bulgar-slayer'
 Constantine Lascaris, promoters of the revival of Greek learning in the Italian peninsula
 Constantine VII, Byzantine Emperor and scholar, 'born in the (Imperial) purple' (Porphyrogenitus)
 Constantine XI (1405–1453), last Byzantine Emperor
 Gemistus Pletho, one of the chief pioneers of the revival of learning in Western Europe.
 Helena, Christian mother of Constantine I
 Irene, Byzantine Empress, instrumental in the restoration of icons, later sanctified
 Johannes Bessarion, bishop and cardinal
 Manuel Chrysoloras, one of the pioneers in introducing Greek literature to western Europe.
 Manuel I Comnenus (1143–1180), Byzantine Emperor, was responsible for a distinct revival of Byzantine fortunes until his defeat at Myriokephalon
 Michael VIII Palaeologus (1159–1182), Byzantine (before 1261 Nicene) Emperor, recaptured Constantinople from the Franks.
 Marcus Musurus, professor of Greek language at the University of Padua.
 Nicephorus II Phocas (963–969), Byzantine Emperor and general
 Romanus IV (1068–1071), lost the fateful battle of Manzikert
 Saint Cyril (827–869), Byzantine monk, developed the Glagolitic alphabet
 Theodora, wife of Justinian I, actress, courtesan, Empress.

Ottoman Empire period
 Atik Sinan, architect for Mehmed II and Mustafa III
 Barbarossa (1473–1518), famous privateer, older brother of Khair ad Din; (Greek mother)
 Laskarina Bouboulina, privateer, naval commander, Greek nationalist fighter
 İbrahim Ethem Pasha, Greek-born Grand Vizier
 Khair ad Din (1475–1546), Greek-born Ottoman Turkish Admiral, also known as Barbarossa; (Greek mother)
 Pargalı İbrahim Pasha, Suleyman the Magnificent's first appointed Grand Vizier, who left an important landmark on his reign.
 Alexandra Mavrokordatou (1605–1683), salonist and intellectual.
 Mimar Sinan, architect for Suleiman the Magnificent
 Kosem Sultan
 İshak Pasha Grand Vizier
 Turgut Reis Ottoman Admiral
 Al-Husayn I ibn Ali founder of the Husainid Dynasty of Tunisia

Modern period

Greece
 Ioannis Kapodistrias (1776–1831), first President of the free and unified Greek state, last President of the first Greek republic 
 Georgios Hatzianestis (1863–1922), General
 Konstantinos Kanaris (c. 1794–1877), freedom fighter, admiral, and Prime Minister of Greece
 Constantine I (1868–1923), King of Greece
 Constantine II (born 1940), King of Greece
 George II (1890–1947), King of Greece
 Paul (1901–1964), King of Greece
 Konstantinos Karamanlis (1907–1998), President of Greece and four-time prime minister
 Kostas Karamanlis (born 1956), Prime Minister of Greece and leader of the New Democracy party – Greek-Macedonian
 Dimitris Plapoutas (1786–1864), Greek General in the Greek War of Independence against the rule of the Ottoman Empire and later a Politician
 Theodoros Kolokotronis (1770–1843), Greek general in the Greek War of Independence against the rule of the Ottoman Empire 
 Pavlos Kountouriotis (1855–1935), admiral, war hero and later President of Greece
 Alexander Mavrocordatos
 Pavlos Melas (1870–1904), hero of Greek Struggle for Macedonia
 Ioannis Metaxas (1871–1941), dictator of Greece before and during the first part of its participation in World War II 
 Andreas Papandreou (1919–1996), economist, politician, and three-time prime minister
 George Andreas Papandreou (born 1952), current leader of the PASOK political party and former Foreign Minister of Greece (1999–2004).
 Aleka Papariga (born 1945), current General Secretary of the Communist Party of Greece (KKE) (1991–)
 Karolos Papoulias (1929–2021), current President of Greece (2005–)
 Kostas Simitis (born 1936), former prime minister of Greece (1996–2004)
 Kostis Stephanopoulos (1926–2016), former president of Greece (1995–2005)
 Aris Velouchiotis (27 August 1905 – 16 June 1945), born Athanasios (Thanasis) Klaras, leader of Ethnikos Laikos Apeleftherotikos Stratos (ELAS), the communist segment of Greek guerrilla resistance during World War II
 Maria Theofili (fl. from 1990s), diplomat, Permanent Representative of Greece to the United Nations
 Eleftherios Venizelos (1864–1936), Prime Minister of Greece during Balkan Wars and First World War 
 Nikos Zachariadis (1903–1973), former Secretary of the Communist Party of Greece (KKE) (1931–1957)

Northern Epirus
 Apostolos Arsachis (1792–1874) Greek-Vlach politician and philanthropist, born in Northern Epirus
 Pyrros Dimas (born 1971) retired weightlifter, considered as one of the greatest of all time, having been three times Olympic champion and three times World Champion.
 Dimitris Nanopoulos (born 1948) world-renowned physicist, of a Northern Epirotian descent
 Georgios Sinas (1783–1856) entrepreneur, banker and national benefactor. Founder of the Athens National Observatory
 Evangelos Zappas (1800–1865) businessman and philanthropist. He is recognized today as the founder of the modern Greek Olympic Games
 Georgios Christakis-Zografos (1863–1920), politician, president of the Autonomous Republic of Northern Epirus

Canada
 John Cannis
 Jim Karygiannis

France
 Marietta Karamanli, (MP) Socialist Party

Romania
 Iannis Pharmakis (died 1821), revolutionary fighter
 Michael von Melas, field-marshal for Austrian Empire
 Cantacuzene governors of Bessarabia and Walachia (1678–1688)

Spain
 Queen Sofía of Spain (born 1938), wife of Spain's king Juan Carlos

United Kingdom
 Prince Philip, Duke of Edinburgh (1921–2021), husband of UK's queen Elizabeth II, born on the island of Corfu
 Norman St.John-Stevas, British politician
 Lord Adonis, British politician

Australia
 Petro Georgiou, federal politician
 John Hatzistergos, Attorney General, NSW
 Jenny Mikakos, politician, VIC
 Maria Vamvakinou, politician

United States
 George Christopher, Mayor of San Francisco, California (1956–64)
 Arianna Huffington (née Arianna Stassinopoulos), liberal pundit and blogger

Musicians

Ancient period
 Alypius composer
 Terpander poet and kitharode

Modern period
 Rita Abatzi musician
 Maurice Abravanel conductor
 Haris Alexiou singer
 Louis Demetrius Alvanis (born 1960) pianist
 Costas Andreou composer and musician
 Theodore Antoniou composer, conductor
 Grigoris Asikis singer and lyricist
 Nikolas Asimos singer and composer
 Nicolas Astrinidis Romanian-born composer who settled in Thessaloniki 
 Gina Bachauer pianist
 Yiorgos Batis musician
 Grigoris Bithikotsis popular singer and lyricist
 Miltiades Caridis conductor
 Pavlos Carrer composer
 Petros Christo guitarist
 Nikos Christodoulou composer and conductor
 Jani Christou composer
 Christos Dantis singer and musician
 Dionysios Demetis composer
 Odysseas Dimitriadis (1908–2005) conductor
 Marina Diamandis singer for Marina and the Diamonds
 Dimitris Dragatakis composer
 Antiochos Evangelatos composer and conductor
 Kostas Exarhakis musician
 Maria Farantouri (born 1947) singer
 Yorgos Foudoulis (born 1964) guitarist and composer
 Eleni Foureira (born 1987) singer
 Gus G. guitarist
 Katy Garbi singer
 Michalis Genitsaris singer and composer
 Christos Govetas musician
 Manos Hadjidakis (1925–1994) composer
 Alkinoos Ioannidis singer and composer
 Sotiris Kakisis poet
 George Kallis composer
 Manolis Kalomiris (1883–1962) composer
 Iakovos Kambanelis poet and lyricist
 Alex Kapranos frontman of the Scottish rock band Franz Ferdinand 
 Eleni Karaindrou composer
 Herbert von Karajan (Herbert Karajannis) (1908–1989) (Austrian of Greek origin)
 Nikos Karvelas composer
 Antonios Katinaris musician
 Bob Katsionis musician
 Akis Katsoupakis (born 1972) musician, composer, and record producer
 Leonidas Kavakos (born 1967) violinist
 Stelios Kazantzidis singer
 Areti Ketime musician
 Panayiotis Kokoras musician and composer
 Iakovos Kolanian guitarist
 Yannis Kotsiras singer and songwriter
 Stavros Koujioumtzis (1932–2005) composer and lyricist
 Rena Kyriakou pianist
 Andreas Lagios guitarist
 Alexandre Lagoya guitarist
 Leo Leandros musician and composer
 Tommy Lee drummer 
 Manos Loizos (1937–1982) composer
 Sokratis Malamas singer and musician
 Nikolaos Mantzaros composer
 Giannis Markopoulos composer
 Kostas Martakis singer
 Marinella singer-songwriter 
 Thanos Mikroutsikos composer
 Dimitris Mitropanos singer, notably the greatest Laika singer of the modern age
 Dimitris Mitropoulos conductor
 Kostas Mountakis musician
 Takis Mousafiris, composer and songwriter
 Georges Moustaki (Greek-French) singer and lyricist
 Orianthi Panagaris singer
 Georgios Kyriacos Panayiotou (George Michael) singer-songwriter (English of Greek ancestry)
 Tzimis Panousis, musician
 Lefteris Papadimitriou composer and performer
 Lefteris Papadopoulos poet and lyricist
 Thanassis Papakonstantinou singer and lyricist
 Helena Paparizou singer, winner of the Eurovision Song Contest 2005 
 Apostolos Paraskevas composer and classical guitarist
 Stelios Perpiniadis musician
 Phivos lyricist
 Sadahzinia musician
 Sakis Rouvas singer and guitarist
 Spyros Samaras composer
 Kalomira Sarantis singer-songwriter, winner of second Fame Story season, third place at Eurovision Song Contest 2008
 Dionysis Savvopoulos singer, composer and lyricist
 Kyriakos Sfetsas composer
 Dimitris Sgouros pianist
 Pavlos Sidiropoulos musician
 Nikos Skalkottas composer
 Kostas Skarvelis composer
 Camille-Marie Stamaty Greek-French composer-pianist
 Paschalis Terzis singer
 Mikis Theodorakis (1925–2021) composer
 Sonia Theodoridou opera singer
 Giorgos Theofanous composer
 Marios Tokas composer of Cypriot origin
 Sakis Tolis musician
 Michalis Travlos composer
 Tatiana Troyanos mezzo-soprano
 Eleni Tsaligopoulou (born 1963) singer
 Iovan Tsaous musician and composer
 Vassilis Tsitsanis popular composer
 Markos Vamvakaris popular composer of rebetiko
 Despina Vandi singer
 Vangelis (Evangelos Odysseas Papathanassiou) (1943-2022) musician and composer
 Anna Rezan performer and lyricist
 Marios Varvoglis composer
 Anna Vissi singer
 Haris Xanthoudakis composer
 Stavros Xarhakos composer and MEP
 Iannis Xenakis (1922–2001) composer
 Nikos Xilouris singer and composer
 Nikos Xydakis pianist and singer
 Spyridon Xyndas composer and guitarist
 Mirka Yemendzakis musician
 Yanni (born 1954) composer, pianist, keyboardist 
 Savvas Ysatis musician
 Sarah P. musician, lyricist, singer
 George Zervanos (1930–2006) operatic tenor
 Dimitri Minakakis former singer for mathcore band The Dillinger Escape Plan

Painters

Ancient period
 Apelles
 Aetion (4th century BCE)
 Berlin Painter
 Euphronius
 Exekias
 Parrhasius
 Polygnotus
 Zeuxis

Renaissance
 El Greco (1541–1614), born Domenicos Theotokopoulos 
 Antonio Vassilacchi

Modern period
 Theophilos Hatzimihail (19th century)
 Demetrios Galanis (19th century)
 Nicholaos Gysis (19th century)
 Nikos Hadjikyriakos-Ghikas (20th century)
 Aris Kalaizis (21st century)
 Julianos Kattinis (20st century)
 Christos Kapralos
 Nikiphoros Lytras (19th century)
 Nikos Nikolaou (20th century)
 Konstantinos Parthenis (20th century)
 Marie Spartali (19th century)
 Yannis Tsarouchis (20th century)
 Odysseus Yakoumakis (21st century)
 Spyros Vassiliou (20th century)

Philosophers

Ancient period
 Anaxarchus of Abdera
 Anaximander (c. 610–546 BCE)
 Anaximenes of Miletus (c. 585–528 BCE)
 Archimedes (c. 287–212 BCE)
 Aristotle (384–322 BCE)
 Athenagoras of Athens (c. 133–190), early Christian apologist
 Celsus (second century CE)
 Democritus (c. 460–370 BCE)
 Diogenes of Sinope (412–323 BCE)
 Empedocles (490–430 BCE)
 Epictetus (55–c. 135 CE)
 Epicurus (341–270 BCE)
 Epimenides (seventh or sixth century BCE), semi-mythical Greek seer
 Eratosthenes (c. 276–195 BCE), mathematician, geographer, poet, astronomer, and music theorist
 Gregory of Nazianzus (c. 329 – 25 January 390)
 Gregory of Nyssa (c. 335–395)
 Hecataeus of Abdera (fourth century BCE)
 Heraclitus (c. 535–475 BCE)
 Hypatia of Alexandria (c. 360–415 CE)
 Irenaeus (c. 140–202 CE)
 Leucippus (fifth century BCE)
 Parmenides (late sixth or early fifth century BCE)
 Pherecydes of Syros (sixth century BCE)
 Plato (c. 427–347 BCE)
 Plotinus (c. 205–270 CE)
 Protagoras (c. 490–420 BCE)
 Pyrrho (c. 360 – c. 270 BC), founder of Pyrrhonism
 Pythagoras (582–496 BCE)
 Sextus Empiricus (c. 160 – c. 210 CE)
 Socrates (470–399 BCE) 
 Thales of Miletus (c. 624–547 BCE)
 Theagenes of Patras (fl. c. 160 CE)
 Theophrastus (c. 371–287 BCE)
 Xenophanes (c. 570–475 BCE)
 Zeno of Citium (333–264 BCE)
 Zeno of Elea (c. 495–430 BC)

Medieval period
 Plethon (c. 1355–1452)
 Michael Psellos (c. 1018–1078 or 1096)

Modern period
 Kostas Axelos (1924–2010)
 Cornelius Castoriadis (1922–1997)
 Takis Fotopoulos (born 1940)
 Anthimos Gazis (1758–1828)
 Nikos Kazantzakis (1883–1957)
 Adamantios Korais (1748–1833)
 Elli Lambridi (1896–1970)
 Michail Papageorgiou (1727–1796)
 Nicos Poulantzas (1936–1979)
 Ioannis Theodorakopoulos (1900–1981)
 Christos Yannaras (born 1935)

Scientists and Engineers

Ancient period
 Anaximander
 Apollonius of Perga
 Archimedes
 Archytas
 Aristarchos of Samos
 Aristotle
 Autolycus of Pitane
 Ctesibius
 Diophantus
 Eratosthenes
 Euclid 
 Eudoxus of Cnidus
 Eupalinos
 Galen
 Heron of Alexandria
 Herophilos
 Hipparchos
 Hippocrates
 Meton of Athens
 Parmenides
 Posidonios
 Ptolemy
 Pythagoras of Samos
 Sostratus of Cnidus
 Strabo
 Thales of Miletus
 Theon
 Theopompus

Medieval period
 Anthemius of Tralles, involved in the construction of the Haghia Sophia
 Isidore of Miletus, 6th-century polymath, principally in charge of design and construction of the Haghia Sophia
 Paul of Aegina, 7th-century physician best known for writing the medical encyclopedia Medical Compendium in Seven Books.
 Leon the Mathematician, 9th-century geometer, subject of a bidding war between the Byzantine Emperor and Caliph al-Mamun
 Callinicus of Heliopolis, engineer, inventor of Greek fire

Modern period
 Georgios Papanikolaou, doctor, Pap smear inventor
 Constantin Carathéodory, mathematician
 Ioannis Argyris, mathematician, Finite Element Method
 Dimitrios Nanopoulos, astrophysicist
 Fotis Kafatos, biologist, current director of the European Research Council
 Christos Papadimitriou, computer scientist
 Georgios Papanikolaou scientist and inventor 
 Manolis Andronikos, archaeologist
 Spyridon Marinatos, archaeologist
 Raphael Salem, mathematician
 Athanassios S. Fokas, mathematician, integrable nonlinear partial differential equations
 Michael L Dertouzos, former Director of the M.I.T. Laboratory for Computer Science
 Nicholas Negroponte, Greek-American founder and Chairman Emeritus of Massachusetts Institute of Technology's Media Lab
 John Iliopoulos, physicist
 Panayiotis Zavos, geneticist
 Joseph Sifakis, computer scientist
 George P. Chrousos, clinical investigator in pediatrics
 Andreas Mandelis, photonics expert

Sculptors

Ancient period
 Agesandros, Athanadoros and Polidoros, composed the Laocoön group
 Agasias
 Callicrates, relief artist, worked on the Parthenon under the direction of Pheidias
 Lysippus
 Myron
 Phidias, sculptor of the colossal statue of Zeus, one of the Seven Wonders of the World 
 Polyclitus
 Polyeuctes
 Pheidias
 Praxiteles
 Scopas

Modern period
 Constantine Andreou (20th century)
 Jannis Kounellis
 Kyveli Makri
 Memos Makris
 Thodoros Papadimitriou
 Nikolaos Pavlopoulos
 Panayiotis Vassilakis
 Electros Vekris
 Lydia Venieri
 Constantin Xenakis
 Takis

Tycoons
 Socratis Kokkalis, telecommunications
 Paris Latsis, shipping
 Yiannis Latsis, shipping
 George Livanos, shipping
 Stavros Niarchos, shipping
 Aristotle Onassis, shipping
 John Paul Papanicolaou, shipping

Writers

Ancient period
 Aeschylus
 Aesop 
 Alcaeus
 Alcman
 Alexander Aetolus
 Anacreon
 Apollodorus
 Apollonius Rhodius
 Aristarchus of Samothrace
 Aristophanes
 Aristophanes of Byzantium
 Callimachus
 Cassius Dio
 Dionysius Thrax
 Euripides
 Eusebius of Caesarea
 Hecataeus of Miletus
 Hecataeus of Abdera
 Hesiod
 Homer 
 Lycophron
 Lysias
 Longus
 Marcus Annaeus Lucanus, frequently called Lucan
 Menander
 Pausanias
 Philitas of Cos
 Pindar
 Plutarch
 Polybius
 Polycarp
 Sappho
 Sophocles 
 Theocritus
 Thucydides
 Zenodotus

Medieval period
 Anna Comnena
 Constantine VII Porphyrogenitus
 Isaac of Nineveh
 John of Damascus
 Michael Psellos
 Procopius
 Zozimus

Modern period
 Aris Alexandrou
 Manolis Anagnostakis
 Iason Athanasiadis
 Constantine P. Cavafy
 Athanasios Christopoulos
 Kiki Dimoula
 Maro Douka
 Odysseus Elytis winner of the Nobel Prize in Literature 1979 
 Andreas Embirikos
 Nikos Engonopoulos
 Jeffrey Eugenides
 Michalis Fakinos
 Rigas Feraios
 Nikos Gatsos
 Kostis Gimossoulis
 Demetris Th. Gotsis
 Sotiris Kakisis
 Andreas Kalvos
 Iakovos Kambanelis
 M. Karagatsis
 Nikos Karouzos
 Kostas Karyotakis
 Nikos Kavvadias
 Nikos Kazantzakis
 Antigone Kefala
 Yannis Kondos
 Menis Koumantareas
 Napoleon Lapathiotis
 Christoforos Liontakis
 Dimitris Lyacos
 Jenny Mastoraki
 Stratis Myrivilis
 Kostis Palamas
 Alexandros Panagoulis
 Alexandros Papadiamantis
 George Pavlopoulos
 George Pelecanos
 Maria Polydouri
 Lefteris Poulios
 Ioannis Psycharis
 Yannis Ritsos
 Miltos Sachtouris
 David Sedaris 
 Giorgos Seferis 
 Angelos Sikelianos
 Takis Sinopoulos
 Giannis Skarimpas
 Dionysios Solomos
 Alexandros Soutsos
 Alexis Stamatis
 Theodore Stephanides
 Vassilis Steriadis
 George Tsimbidaros-Fteris
 Nanos Valaoritis
 Kostas Varnalis
 Vassilis Vassilikos
 Haris Vlavianos

General
 Manolis Andronikos (1919–1992), archaeologist, discovered the Macedonian tombs in Vergina
 Gianna Angelopoulos-Daskalaki, President of organising committee, Athens 2004 Olympic Games
 Marie Aspioti, M.B.E, distinguished Corfiote magazine publisher and cultural figure who influenced the literary and cultural life of post-war Corfu
 Patriarch Athenagoras, former Patriarch of Constantinople
 Patriarch Bartholomew I of Constantinople, Greek-Orthodox Ecumenical Patriarch
 George Bizos, Greek-South African human rights advocate
 Moisis Michail Bourlas, member of World War II Greek resistance
 Maria Callas, soprano
 Cornelius Castoriadis, economist and philosopher
 Zoe Cruz, co-president of Morgan Stanley
 Michael Dertouzos, internet pioneer
 Odysseas Elytis, poet and Nobel prize winner
 Mario Frangoulis, opera singer
 Ioanna-Maria Gertsou (born 1979), activist
 Manolis Glezos, World War II veteran, grassroots democracy activist and politician
 Nikos Hadjinikolaou (born 1962), television news anchor, journalist
 Iakovos, Archbishop of America (died 2005), late primate of the Greek-Orthodox Archdiocese of America
 Hipparch
 Hipparchus
 Sir Alec Issigonis, British-Greek creator of the Mini car
 Eleni Konsolaki, archaeologist who researched Methana and the Troezen area in 1990
 Vissarion Korkoliacos (1908–1991), Greek Orthodox monk
 Polyvios Kossivas, bystander who became famous in the 2004 Olympic Games for helping a runner
 Makarios III, Greek Orthodox Archbishop of Cyprus
 Spyridon Marinatos, archaeologist
 Melina Mercouri, actress, singer and politician
 Dimitri Nanopoulos, quantum physicist
 Lefteris Papadopoulos (born 1935), lyricist and journalist
 Dimitris Varos, poet and journalist
 Dimitris Papaioannou, director and choreographer, creator of the 2004 Summer Olympics ceremonies
 Peisistratos
 Andreas Petroulakis, cartoonist
 Saint Philomena, patron saint of the children of Mary and Catholic saint and martyr
 Nicos Poulantsas, political theorist
 Christopher Nicholas Sarantakos, world known magician and illusionist that created Mindfreak; also known as Criss Angel
 Grigoris Papaioannou, world known magician, illusionist, escapologist; professionally known as Blonde Magician
 George Sava, entertainment lawyer
 Giorgos Seferis, poet and Nobel prize winner
 Angelos Sikelianos, poet
 Spyros Skouras, Greek-American movie mogul, president of 20th Century Fox
 Alex Spanos, Greek-American magnate
 Iannis Xenakis, modernist composer
 Panayiotis Zavos, geneticist
 Adamantios Vassilakis, diplomat

Academics
 Constantin Carathéodory, mathematician (1920s)
 Chris Argyris, organisational theorist
 Konstantinos Axelos, 1960s Situationist
 Apostolos Athanassakis, classicist
Anthony Kaldellis, historian
 Phaedon Avouris, nanotechnologist
 Demetrios Christodoulou, mathematical physicist
 George Constantinides, economist
 Helen Fessas-Emmanouil, architect
 Dimitrios Galanos, Sanskrit translator and Indologist
 Fotis Kafatos, biologist
 Jannis Kallinikos, organisational theorist
 Dimitri Kitsikis, historian, poet
 Andreas Mandelis, expert on photonics
 Doula Mouriki, Byzantine art historian
 Dimitri Nanopoulos, quantum physicist
 Nicholas Negroponte, author, IT evangelist and head of MIT Media Lab
 Irena Papadopoulos, author, professor of transcultural nursing
 Christos Papakyriakopoulos, mathematician
 Christos Papadimitriou, computer scientist
 George Papanicolaou, biologist
 John S. Paraskevopoulos, astronomer
 Nicholas A. Peppas, chaired professor in Engineering, University of Texas at Austin
 Vladimir Triandafillov (Triantafyllidis), military strategist
 Haridimos Tsoukas, organisational theorist
 George Vithoulkas, teacher of Homeopathic medicine
 Xenophon Zolotas, economist

List of Greeks who were born outside modern Greece
This is a list of ethnic Greeks who were born after the Declaration of the Greek War of Independence (1821), outside the borders of the Greek state. The list does not include Greeks born in the diasporan communities or Greeks of Cyprus (after its independence in 1960), but only Greeks born in the traditional Greek homelands (the Balkans, Anatolia and the Eastern Mediterranean shores).

Actors/actresses
 Cybele (1887–1978): Smyrna,  Ottoman Empire
 Manos Katrakis (1908–1984): Crete,  then an autonomous province of the Ottoman Empire
 Alexis Minotis (1898–1990): Chania, Crete,  then part of the Ottoman Empire
 Sotiris Moustakas (1940–2007): Limassol, Cyprus,  then part of the British Empire
 Sapfo Notara (1907–1985): Crete,  then an autonomous province of the Ottoman Empire
 Nikos Stavridis (1910–1987): Samos, Principality of Samos, then an autonomous principality under Ottoman suzerainty

Athletes

 Pyrros Dimas (1971–): Himara,  Albania
 Leonidas Sampanis (1971–): Korytsa,  Albania
 Apostolos Nikolaidis (1896–1980): Plovdiv,  Bulgaria

Clerics

 Archbishop Chrysanthus of Athens (1881–1949): Gratini, Thrace,  then part of the Ottoman Empire
 Archbishop Spyridon of Athens (1873–1956): Chili,  Ottoman Empire
 Ecumenical Patriarch Joachim III of Constantinople (1834–1912): Constantinople,  Ottoman Empire
 Ecumenical Patriarch Maximus V of Constantinople (1897–1972): Sinope,  Ottoman Empire
 Ecumenical Patriarch Athenagoras I of Constantinople (1886–1972): Vasilikón, Ioannina, Epirus,  then part of the Ottoman Empire
 Archbishop Iakovos of America (1911–2005): Imbros,  Ottoman Empire
 Makarios III (1913–1977): Panagia, Paphos, Cyprus,  then part of the British Empire
 Ecumenical Patriarch Demetrius I of Constantinople (1914–1991): Constantinople,  Ottoman Empire
 Ecumenical Patriarch Bartholomew I of Constantinople (1940–): Imbros,  Turkey

Entrepreneurs

 John D. Chandris (1890–1942): Chios,  then part of the Ottoman Empire
 Aristotle Onassis (1906–1975): Smyrna,  Ottoman Empire
 Basil Zaharoff (1849–1936): Muğla,  Ottoman Empire

Fashion designers

 Sotirios Boulgaris (1857–1932): Paramythia, Epirus,  then part of the Ottoman Empire

Filmmakers

 Elia Kazan (1909–2003): Constantinople,  Ottoman Empire
 Michael Cacoyannis (1922–2011): Limassol, Cyprus,  then part of the British Empire

Military and political leaders

 Stephanos Skouloudis (1838–1928): Constantinople,  Ottoman Empire; Prime Minister of Greece
 Georgios Theotokis (1844–1916): Corfu,  United States of the Ionian Islands then part of the British Empire; Prime Minister of Greece
 Spyridon Lambros (1851–1919): Corfu,  United States of the Ionian Islands then part of the British Empire; Prime Minister of Greece
 Themistoklis Sophoulis (1860–1949): Vathy, Samos,  then an autonomous principality under Ottoman suzerainty; Prime Minister of Greece
 Eleftherios Venizelos (1864–1936): Mournies, Chania, Crete,  then part of the Ottoman Empire; Prime Minister of Greece
 Emmanouil Tsouderos (1882–1956): Rethymno, Crete,  then part of the Ottoman Empire; Prime Minister of Greece
 Konstantinos Tsaldaris (1884–1970): Alexandria,  Khedivate of Egypt, Prime Minister of Greece
 Alexandros Svolos (1892–1956): Krusevo,  Ottoman Empire, Prime Minister of Greece
 Sophoklis Venizelos (1894–1964): Chania, Crete,  then part of the Ottoman Empire; Prime Minister of Greece
 Evripidis Bakirtzis (1895–1947): Kozani, Macedonia;  then part of the Ottoman Empire; leader of the Political Committee of National Liberation during World War II
 Konstantinos Karamanlis (1907–1998): Proti, Serres,  then part of the Ottoman Empire; Prime Minister and then President of Greece

Musicians

 Manolis Kalomiris (1883–1962): Smyrna,  Ottoman Empire
 Rita Abatzi (1914–1969): Smyrna,  Ottoman Empire
 Marios Tokas (1954–2008): Limassol, Cyprus,  then part of the British Empire

Painters

 Theophilos Hatzimihail (1870–1934): Vareia, Lesbos,  then part of the Ottoman Empire

Philosophers

 Cornelius Castoriadis (1922–1997): Constantinople,  Ottoman Empire

Scientists and engineers

 Manolis Andronikos (1919–1992): Prousa,  Ottoman Empire
 Panayiotis Zavos (1944–): Tricomo,  Cyprus then part of the British Empire

Sculptors

 Pavlos Prosalentis (1784–1837): Corfu,  Republic of Venice
 Konstantinos Dimitriadis (1879 or 1881–1943): Stenimachos, Eastern Rumelia
 Costas Valsamis (1908–2003): Symi,  Ottoman Empire
 Dimitra Tserkezou (1920–2007): Constantinople,  Ottoman Empire

Singers

 Alkistis Protopsalti (1954–): Alexandria,  Egypt
 Anna Vissi (1957–): Larnaca,  Cyprus then part of the British Empire
 Elena Paparizou (1982–): Borås, Sweden

Tycoons

 Aristotle Onassis (1906–1975): Smyrna,  Ottoman Empire

Writers

 Constantine P. Cavafy (1863–1933): Alexandria,  Ottoman Egypt
 Nikos Kazantzakis (1883–1957): Heraklion, Crete,  then part of the Ottoman Empire
 Giorgos Seferis (1900–1971): Urla, Smyrna,  Ottoman Empire
 Odysseas Elytis (1911–1996): Crete,  then an autonomous province of the Ottoman Empire

General

 Sir Alec Issigonis (1906–1988): Smyrna,  Ottoman Empire

See also
 Great Greeks
 List of Greek Jews
 List of ancient Greeks
 List of Greek Americans
 List of Greek Canadians
 List of Greek Australians
 List of people by nationality

References

 *